Fine Gael is the third largest political party in the Oireachtas. The Fine Gael leader appoints a team of TDs and Senators to speak for the party on different issues. When Fine Gael was in opposition, the front bench areas of responsibility broadly corresponded to those of Government ministers. Fine Gael has been in Government since March 2011 and accordingly their front bench consists of the ministerial officeholders. In 2020 a number of non ministerial office holders were appointed as spokespeople for policy areas where Fine Gael does not have a minister.

Fine Gael Ministers

Ministers of Government
On 27 June 2020, six Fine Gael TDs were appointed to the 32nd Government of Ireland.

Ministers of State
On 27 June 2020, the government on the nomination of the Taoiseach appointed Fine Gael TD, Hildegarde Naughton as a Minister of State, attending Government meetings without a vote. On 1 July, the government appointed seven further Fine Gael TDs as Ministers of State on the nomination of the Taoiseach.

Fine Gael Party Spokespeople

Party Spokespeople

On 22 July 2020, at a meeting of the Fine Gael Parliamentary Party the Parliamentary Party chair, deputy chair, secretary and assistant secretary were elected.
On 30 September 2020, Fine Gael Leader, Leo Varadkar, appointed a number TDs as party spokespeople covering policy areas in which the party does not have a minister. Their role is to support the Government, develop policy, speak in the Dáil and media and engage with interest groups in these areas on behalf of the party. In most cases, they are the lead Fine Gael member and convener on the relevant Joint Oireachtas Committee.

Seanad Spokespeople
On 10 July 2020, Fine Gael Leader, Leo Varadkar announced the Seanad Spokespersons for the party. Their role is to support the Government, develop policy, speak in the Seanad on matters relating to their policy area on behalf of Fine Gael. On 18 September 2020, Fine Gael Senator, Joe O'Reilly was elected Leas Cathaoirleach of the Seanad.

References

Fine Gael
Front benches in the Oireachtas